Aleksandr Ivanonich Kuzmin (28 October 1941 – 11 April 2022) was a Russian diplomat. He served as Russian Ambassador to Sudan from 1992 to 1998. He died in Moscow on 11 April 2022 at the age of 80.

References

1941 births
2022 deaths
Russian diplomats
Ambassador Extraordinary and Plenipotentiary (Russian Federation)
Ambassadors of Russia to Sudan
Moscow State Institute of International Relations alumni
Recipients of the Order of the Red Star